This is a list of the butterflies of family Papilionidae (superfamily Papilionoidea), or the swallowtails, which are found in India. This family of large and beautiful butterflies is well represented with 89 species found within Indian borders. Two of the three papilionid subfamilies are represented in India, namely, the Parnassiinae or Apollos, with 19 species, and the Papilioninae or swallowtails, with 70 species.

The area of India falls in the Indomalayan realm, except for the Himalayas above and beyond the foothills adjoining the Indo-Gangetic Plains, and which fall in the Palearctic realm, resulting in increased diversity of papilionid butterflies, especially the Parnassiini or snow Apollos, all species of which are Palearctic.

Indian swallowtails are spread over all the biomes/ecoregions of India. The Malabar banded peacock (Papilio buddha) and the Malabar banded swallowtail (Papilio liomedon) fly at sea level while the Apollos (Parnassius species), are to be found only in the highest alpine meadows of the Himalayas. Some species such as the common Mormon (Papilio polytes) and the blue Mormon (Papilio polymnestor) fly at ground level whereas others, such as the tailed jay (Graphium agamemnon) are normally found flying high in the forest canopy. The lime butterfly (Papilio demoleus) is a creature of arid scrub-land, occasionally being spotted even in the Thar Desert, while the tropical evergreen forests have their own representatives, such as the red Helen (Papilio helenus), the common bluebottle (Graphium cloanthus) and the Malabar raven (Papilio dravidarum). Indian papilionids such as the common Mormon (Papilio polytes) and great Mormon (Papilio memnon) show polymorphism with many mimetic female forms.

Amongst swallowtails, endemism is found only in the Western Ghats. Notable endemics are the southern birdwing (Troides minos), Malabar banded swallowtail (Papilio liomedon), Malabar raven (Papilio dravidarum), Malabar rose (Pachliopta pandiyana) and the Malabar banded peacock (Papilio buddha).

This list is based on A Synoptic Catalogue of the Butterflies of India by R. K. Varshney and Peter Smetacek (2015).

Subfamily Papilioninae
The swallowtails are generally easily identified in the field by their large size, prominent markings, colour, patterns and variable wing and tail shape.

Tribe Troidini

Troides Huebner, [1819] – birdwings 

The birdwings, as the Troides butterflies are called are large, yellow-and-black coloured butterflies, two species of which are found in the forests of the Himalayas and one species in the Western Ghats. These are the largest butterflies found in India.
 Common birdwing, Troides helena (Linnaeus, 1758)
 Southern birdwing, Troides minos (Cramer, [1779])
 Golden birdwing, Troides aeacus (C. Felder & R. Felder, 1860)

Red-bodied swallowtails

The genera Losaria, Pachliopta and Byasa of the Indian Troidini are commonly called as the red-bodied swallowtails along with the Atrophaneura. They were formerly considered to be subgenera under genus Atrophaneura till several authorities elevated them to genus level in their publications (e.g. LepIndex; GLoBIS; Racheli & Cotton (2010)). These butterflies sequester toxins from plants and are inedible or poisonous to predators. They also have warning colouration, a phenomenon also known as aposematism. The red-bodied swallowtails are involved in Batesian mimicry complexes as aposematic models which are mimicked by edible species.

Atrophaneura Reakirt, [1865] – batwings 
Red-bodied swallowtails with black wings hat are found in low elevation forests along the Himalayas and the Northeast of India.
 Lesser batwing, Atrophaneura aidoneus (Doubleday, 1845)
 Common batwing, Atrophaneura varuna (A. White, 1842)

Byasa Moore, 1882 – windmills 
Black-coloured red-bodied swallowtails with elongated wings, prominent white and red spots, and tails that are found in low elevation forests along the Himalayas and the Northeast of India.
 Common windmill, Byasa polyeuctes (Doubleday, 1842)
 Rose windmill, Byasa latreillei (Donovan, 1826)
 Neville's windmill, Byasa nevilli (Wood-Mason, 1882)
 De Nicéville's windmill, Byasa polla (de Nicéville, 1897)

 Great windmill, Byasa dasarada (Moore, 1858)
 Black windmill, Byasa crassipes (Oberthür, 1893)
 Chinese windmill, Byasa plutonius (Oberthür, 1876)

Losaria Moore, 1902 – clubtails 
Red-bodied swallowtails with club-shaped tails that are found in low elevation forests along the Himalayas and the Northeast of India.

 Common clubtail, earlier Losaria coon (Fabricius, 1793) now Losaria doubledayi (Wallace, 1885)
 Andaman clubtail, Losaria rhodifer (Butler, 1876)

Pachliopta Reakirt, [1865] – roses 
Red-bodied swallowtails commonly found all over India (except for the endemic Malabar rose), which serve as aposematic models for Papilio polytes in Batesian mimicry complex.

 Common rose, Pachliopta aristolochiae (Fabricius, 1775)
 Crimson rose, Pachliopta hector (Linnaeus, 1758)
 Malabar rose, Pachliopta pandiyana (Moore, 1881)

Tribe Papilionini

Papilio Linnaeus, 1758 – swallowtails 
Black-bodied swallowtails, often distinctively marked, some widely distributed, which are edible and form Batesian mimicry complexes with danaines or red-bodied swallowtails. Some species are polymorphic, mostly in the female forms.

Papilio (Chilasa) – mimes

Medium-sized tailless swallowtail butterflies which mimic the milkweed butterflies, which they fly alongside, both in appearance and methods of flight. Except for the Common Mime which is also found in peninsular India, they are confined to the lower Himalayas and Northeast India.
 Tawny mime, Papilio agestor Gray, 1831
 Lesser mime, Papilio epycides Hewitson, 1864
 Blue striped mime, Papilio slateri Hewitson, 1859
 Great blue mime, Papilio paradoxa (Zinken, 1831)
 Common mime, Papilio clytia, Linnaeus, 1758

Papilio (Papilio) – yellow swallowtails

species group machaon
 Common yellow swallowtail, Papilio machaon Linnaeus, 1758

Papilio (Princeps) – Mormons, Helens, ravens 
species group demodocus
 Lime butterfly, Papilio demoleus Linnaeus, 1758

species group demolion
 Malabar banded swallowtail, Papilio liomedon Moore, 1875

species group polytes
 Common Mormon, Papilio polytes Linnaeus, 1758

species group helenus
Large, tailed, black butterflies with prominent yellow patch on upper hindwing markings, which occur along the low elevation forests of the Himalayas, the Western Ghats and some peninsular Indian forests.
 Red Helen, Papilio helenus Linnaeus, 1758
 Yellow Helen, Papilio nephelus Boisduval, 1836
 Andaman Helen, Papilio prexaspes C. Felder & R. Felder, 1865

species group memnon
Large, tailless, black butterflies with blue and white markings, which occur along the low elevation forests of the Himalayas, the Western Ghats and some peninsular Indian forests. Despite the name, only the great Mormon is polymorphic.
 Great Mormon, Papilio memnon Linnaeus, 1758
 Blue Mormon, Papilio polymnestor Cramer, [1775]
 Andaman Mormon, Papilio mayo Atkinson, [1874]

species group protenor
Large tailless swallowtails which are black above with no white marking and which do not have basal red markings below. Found in Himayas and Northeast India in low elevation jungles.
 Spangle, Papilio protenor Cramer, [1775]
 Redbreast, Papilio alcmenor C. Felder & R. Felder, [1864]

species group bootes
 Tailed redbreast, Papilio bootes Westwood, 1842

species group castor
Tailless black or blackish-brown butterflies with white markings, the females or both sexes of which mimic inedible milkweed butterflies.
 Common raven, Papilio castor Westwood, 1842
 Malabar raven, Papilio dravidarum Wood-Mason, 1880

Papilio (Achillides) – peacocks

Large strong-flying black butterflies with distinctive colourful markings, most species of which occur along the low elevation forests of the Himalayas while a few species occur in the Western Ghats and some peninsular Indian forests.
species group paris
 Blue peacock, Papilio arcturus Westwood, 1842
 Common peacock, Papilio bianor Cramer, [1777]
 Yellow-crested spangle, Papilio elephenor Doubleday, 1845
 Paris peacock, Papilio paris Linnaeus, 1758
 Krishna peacock, Papilio krishna Moore, 1858

species group: palinurus
 Common banded peacock, Papilio crino Fabricius, 1793
 Malabar banded peacock, Papilio buddha Westwood, 1872

Papilio (Sinoprinceps) – Chinese swallowtails
species group: xuthus
 Chinese yellow swallowtail, Papilio xuthus Linnaeus, 1767

Tribe Leptocircini

Graphium Scopoli, 1777 – bluebottles, jays, swordtails and zebras

Graphium (Graphium) – bluebottles and jays
 Common bluebottle, Graphium sarpedon (Linnaeus, 1758)
 Glassy bluebottle, Graphium cloanthus (Westwood, 1841)
 Common jay, Graphium doson (C. Felder & R. Felder, 1864)
 Tailed jay, Graphium agamemnon (Linnaeus, 1758)

 Spotted jay, Graphium arycles (Boisduval, 1836)
 Veined jay, Graphium chironides (Honrath, 1884)
 Great jay, Graphium eurypylus (Linnaeus, 1758)
 Scarce jay, Graphium albociliates (Fruhstorfer, 1901)

Graphium (Paranticopsis) – zebras
The zebras are tailless swallowtails found in the Himalayas and Northeast that mimic the aposematic bluish-white Danaus milkweed butterflies. 
 Great zebra, Graphium xenocles (Doubleday, 1842) 
 Lesser zebra, Graphium macareus (Godart, 1819)
 Spotted zebra, Graphium megarus (Westwood, 1844)

Swordtails 
These butterflies, formerly Graphium, are now divided into two genera Pathysa and Pazala. They are large white butterflies with black bars in the cells of the forewings, and the hindwings each bearing a long sword-like tail. They are butterflies of hilly forests from the Himalayas to the Northeast, except for the fivebar swordtail which also flies in the Western Ghats and the spot swordtail which is also found in peninsular India and the Indo-Gangetic plains.

Graphium (Pathysa) – swordtails

 Fourbar swordtail, Graphium agetes (Westwood, 1843)
 Fivebar swordtail, Graphium antiphates (Cramer, [1775])
 Chain swordtail, Graphium aristeus (Stoll, [1780])
 Andaman swordtail, Graphium epaminondas (Oberthür, 1879)
 Spot swordtail, Graphium nomius (Esper, 1799)

Graphium (Pazala) – swordtails
 Sixbar swordtail, Graphium eurous (Leech, [1893])
 Spectacle swordtail, Graphium mandarinus (Oberthür, 1879)

Lamproptera Gray, 1832 – dragontails 

Lamproptera or dragontails, are small swallowtail butterflies with large tails found in the tropical and subtropical forests of Northeast India, and further East.
 Green dragontail, Lamproptera meges (Zinken, 1831)
 White dragontail, Lamproptera curius (Fabricius, 1787)

Tribe Teinopalpini

Teinopalpus Hope, 1843 – Kaiser-e-Hind 

The Kaiser-i-Hind is a rare species of swallowtail butterfly found from Nepal and north India eastwards to north Vietnam. The common name literally means "Emperor of India", and it is much sought after by butterfly collectors for its beauty and rarity.
 Kaiser-e-Hind, Teinopalpus imperialis Hope, 1843

Meandrusa Moore, 1888 – hooked swallowtails 

Large sombre-coloured swallowtails with triangular forewings with concave outer margins, sinuously margined hindwing and long outwardly-curved spatulate tail. Found in low elevation forests along the central and eastern Himalayas and the Northeast.
 Brown gorgon, Meandrusa lachinus (Fruhstorfer, 1902)
 Yellow gorgon, Meandrusa payeni (Boisduval, 1836)

Subfamily Parnassiinae

The Parnassiinae include about 50 medium-sized, white or yellow high-altitude butterflies that are distributed across Asia, Europe and North America, of which 19 species fly in India.

Tribe Zerynthiini

Bhutanitis Atkinson, 1873 – Bhutan glory 
The genus Bhutanitis contains large butterflies that are black with thin white stripes above, have red and yellow tornal patches on the hindwing, and a number of tails, which are found in the region of Bhutan, Northeast India, Myanmar, Thailand and South China.
 Bhutan glory, Bhutanitis lidderdalii Atkinson, 1873
 Ludlow's Bhutan glory, Bhutanitis ludlowi Gabriel, 1942

Tribe Parnassiini

Parnassius Latreille, 1804 – Apollos 
The Apollos, genus Parnassius are high altitude palearctic butterflies that are different in appearance from other swallowtails, being of moderate size, with white ground colour, and spotted with red, black and blue.
Subgenus Parnassius Latreille, 1804
 Scarce red Apollo, Parnassius actius (Eversmann, 1843)
 Common red Apollo, Parnassius epaphus Oberthür, 1879
 Keeled Apollo, Parnassius jacquemontii Boisduval, 1836
 Large keeled Apollo, Parnassius tianschianicus Oberthür, 1879

Subgenus Kailasius Moore, 1902
 Regal Apollo, Parnassius charltonius Gray, [1853]
 Stately Apollo, Parnassius loxias Püngeler, 1901 
 Noble Apollo, Parnassius augustus Fruhstorfer, 1903
 Dusky Apollo Parnassius acdestis Grum-Grshimailo, 1891

Subgenus Koramius Moore, 1902 
 Karakoram banded Apollo, Parnassius hunza Grum-Grshimailo, 1888
 Scarce banded Apollo Parnassius mamaeivi Bang-Haas, 1915 
 Greater banded Apollo, Parnassius stenosemus Honrath, 1890 
 Lesser banded Apollo, Parnassius stoliczkanus C. Felder & R. Felder, 1865
 Himalayan banded Apollo, Parnassius kumaonensis Riley, 1926

Subgenus Tadumia Moore, 1902
 Varnished Apollo, Parnassius acco Gray, [1853]
 Royal Apollo, Parnassius maharaja Avinoff, 1916

Subgenus Lingamius Bryk, 1935 
 Common blue Apollo, Parnassius hardwickii Gray, 1831

Subgenus Kreizbergia Korshunov, 1990
 Black-edged Apollo, Parnassius simo Gray, 1853

See also

Papilionidae
List of butterflies of India

Cited references

Further reading

 

Papilionidae

B